Man Fire Food is an American food travelogue television series that airs on Cooking Channel. It is presented by chef Roger Mooking; and the series features Mooking traveling to different cities and learning unique methods of barbecuing.

Man Fire Food officially premiered on September 28, 2012.

On April 29, 2020, it was announced that the ninth season will premiere on May 20, 2020.

Episodes

Season 1

Season 2

Season 3

Season 4

Season 5

Season 6

Notes

References

External links
 
 
 IW Productions, L.L.C. –

2010s American cooking television series
2012 American television series debuts
Cooking Channel original programming
English-language television shows
Food reality television series
Food travelogue television series